The Chinese Softball Association is a non-government, non-profit organization, headquartered in Beijing. It was affiliated to the Chinese Baseball and Softball Association and became an independent organization in 1986. The association is a member of the All-China Sports Federation.

Under the Chinese Softball Association there are the Standing Committee, the National Committee, the Secretariat, the Coaches Committee, the Judges Committee, the Research and Development Committee and the Publicity Committee.

Tasks of the Association 

 to host and organize national and international competitions.
 to provide guidance for the training of national and local softball teams;
 to formulate rules on the management and holding games;
 to organize training programs for athletes, coaches, and judges;
 to set up national standards on evaluation of athletes, coaches, and judges;
 to select and recommend players and coaches of the national softball team;
 to organize the training of the national team and its participation in international competitions;
 to organize international exchanges and cooperation activities.

External links
 

Softball
Softball organizations
Softball
Sports organizations established in 1986
Softball in China
1986 establishments in China